The Karnstein Trilogy, a series of vampire films, was produced by Hammer Films. They are notable at the time for their (for the time) daring lesbian storylines. All three films were scripted by Tudor Gates. They are related by vampires of the noble Karnstein family, and their seat Castle Karnstein near the town of Karnstein in Styria, Austria.

The trilogy
 The Vampire Lovers (1970), set in 1790 Styria, starred Polish-born Ingrid Pitt as lesbian vampire Countess Mircalla Karnstein (born 1522, died 1546). The film was based on the famous 1872 novella "Carmilla" by J. Sheridan Le Fanu; the name Mircalla being an anagram of Carmilla, which is an alias Mircalla uses throughout the story.
 Lust for a Vampire (1971), featured Danish actress Yutte Stensgaard as Mircalla's descendant Carmilla (born 1688, died 1710). Set in 1830 (it's suggested the Karnsteins reappear every 40 years), Carmilla adopts the name of her ancestor to seduce and murder her way through an exclusive girls' school.
 Twins of Evil (1971) features Damien Thomas as Mircalla's descendant, the evil Count Karnstein. Mircalla herself, played by German actress Katya Wyeth, appears briefly (though her date of death is now given as 1547). The story concerns sisters Maria and Frieda Gellhorn (played by identical twin Playboy Playmates Mary Collinson and Madeleine Collinson). It is apparently a prequel to the first film: it depicts a member of the Karnstein family as living instead of vampiric and the set design and costumes give the film a 17th-century look and feel, thus resulting in each of the three films being set in a different century.

Other films
A planned fourth film in the series, variously announced as either The Vampire Virgins or The Vampire Hunters, only got as far as the early draft stage.

The 1974 film Captain Kronos – Vampire Hunter features a female vampire from the Karnstein family, and is sometimes considered part of the same continuity, though it takes place in England rather than in Central Europe.

Vampire lore
The vampires of the Karnstein Trilogy differ from those of the Hammer Dracula films. Here, vampires can walk about in daylight and are immune to fire (their bodies are consumed, but their spirits just create or inhabit a new body). Their weaknesses are garlic and crosses, and the only ways to kill them is by staking them through their hearts or beheading them. Some of this lore is retained in the 1972 Hammer film Vampire Circus.

 Cast and characters
 A  indicates the actor portrayed the role of a younger version of the character.
 An  indicates a role as an older version of the character.
 A  indicates the actor or actress lent only his or her voice for his or her film character.
 An  indicates the model served as a body double, with the actor or actress's likeness superimposed onto the model.
 An  indicates the actor or actress lent only their likeness for his or her film character.
 A  indicates an appearance through a photographic still.
 An  indicates an appearance through archival footage or audio.
 A dark gray cell indicates the character was not in the film.

References

British film series
Trilogies
Vampire film series